Anderson is a city in McDonald County, Missouri, United States. The population was 1,961 at the 2010 census.

History
A post office called Anderson has been in operation since 1886. The community has the name of Robert Anderson, a local merchant.

Geography
Anderson is located on Indian Creek at the intersection of Missouri Routes 59 and 76 and U.S. Route 71.

Demographics

2010 census
As of the census of 2010, there were 1,961 people, 715 households, and 486 families living in the city. The racial makeup of the city was 85.8% White, 0.4% African American, 4.8% Native American, 0.6% Asian, 0.5% Pacific Islander, 4.9% from other races, and 2.9% from two or more races. Hispanic or Latino of any race were 9.7% of the population.

There were 715 households, of which 39.6% had children under the age of 18 living with them, 46.2% were married couples living together, 15.7% had a female householder with no husband present, 6.2% had a male householder with no wife present, and 32.0% were non-families. 27.7% of all households were made up of individuals, and 10.4% had someone living alone who was 65 years of age or older. The average household size was 2.62 and the average family size was 3.17.

The median age in the city was 34.3 years. 27% of residents were under the age of 18; 10.2% were between the ages of 18 and 24; 25.5% were from 25 to 44; 22.2% were from 45 to 64; and 15.2% were 65 years of age or older. The gender makeup of the city was 49.0% male and 51.0% female.

2000 census
As of the census of 2000, there were 1,856 people, 712 households, and 462 families living in the city. The population density was 965.4 people per square mile (373.2/km2). There were 781 housing units at an average density of 406.2 per square mile (157.1/km2). The racial makeup of the city was 90.68% White, 0.59% African American, 3.50% Native American, 0.16% Asian, 0.11% Pacific Islander, 1.94% from other races, and 3.02% from two or more races. Hispanic or Latino of any race were 3.45% of the population.

There were 712 households, out of which 34.3% had children under the age of 18 living with them, 46.3% were married couples living together, 14.6% had a female householder with no husband present, and 35.1% were non-families. 30.5% of all households were made up of individuals, and 14.2% had someone living alone who was 65 years of age or older. The average household size was 2.47 and the average family size was 3.05.

In the city the population was spread out, with 27.2% under the age of 18, 9.8% from 18 to 24, 26.5% from 25 to 44, 19.7% from 45 to 64, and 16.9% who were 65 years of age or older. The median age was 35 years. For every 100 females, there were 88.2 males. For every 100 females age 18 and over, there were 81.2 males.

The median income for a household in the city was $23,966, and the median income for a family was $31,406. Males had a median income of $24,018 versus $17,679 for females. The per capita income for the city was $12,967. About 21.5% of families and 25.1% of the population were below the poverty line, including 35.8% of those under age 18 and 22.1% of those age 65 or over.

Education
Anderson is home to McDonald County High School. The school mascot is the Mustang.

References

External links
 Historic Sanborn Map of Anderson from University of Missouri Digital Library

Cities in Missouri
Cities in McDonald County, Missouri